Springvale railway station is located on the Pakenham and Cranbourne lines in Victoria, Australia. It serves the south-eastern Melbourne suburb of Springvale, and it opened on 1 September 1880 as Spring Vale. It was renamed Springvale on 29 February 1972.

History

Springvale station opened on 1 September 1880, almost three years after the railway line from Oakleigh was extended to Dandenong. Like the suburb itself, the station was named after the Spring Vale Hotel, the proprietor inspired by the natural springs in the area for travellers and stock between Melbourne and Dandenong. The name was also inspired by a place near the Bog of Allen in the proprietor's native Ireland.

In 1964, boom barriers replaced interlocked gates at the former Springvale Road level crossing, which was located at the Up end of the station.

In 1975, the signal box was provided with a new relay interlocking system. Also in that year, a crossover was abolished at the Up end of the station, with a new crossover provided at the Down end. In 1976, the goods platform was abolished.

On 7 June 1996, Springvale was upgraded to a Premium Station.

The remnant of a former branch line, which operated to Spring Vale Cemetery station, was located at the Down end of the station. In 1922, it was provided with overhead wiring. In 1952, the majority of the line was dismantled, with the remaining portion of the line becoming a siding. In October 2002, it was booked out of use and, in August 2008, the associated points and signals, the crossover and overhead wiring were removed.

On 30 January 2012, the signal box was abolished, with control transferred to the Dandenong signal box. In mid-2013, construction commenced on a grade separation project to eliminate the Springvale Road level crossing, immediately adjacent to the station. As part of this project, a new station was constructed below street level, which opened on 22 April 2014.

Facilities, platforms and services

Springvale has two side platforms, with a concourse above on ground level. The concourse features a customer service window, an enclosed waiting room and toilets. Inside this enclosed waiting room there is a small coffee kiosk. Access to the platforms is provided by stairs and ramps.

It is serviced by Metro Trains' Pakenham and Cranbourne line services.

Platform 1:
  all stations and limited express services to Flinders Street
  all stations and limited express services to Flinders Street

Platform 2:
  all stations and limited express services to Pakenham
  all stations services to Cranbourne

Future services:
In addition to the current services the Network Development Plan Metropolitan Rail proposes linking the Pakenham and Cranbourne lines to both the Sunbury line and under-construction Melbourne Airport rail link via the Metro Tunnel.
  express services to West Footscray and Sunbury (2025 onwards)
  express services to Melbourne Airport (2029 onwards)

Transport links

Kinetic Melbourne operates one SmartBus route via Springvale station, under contract to Public Transport Victoria:
  : Chelsea station – Westfield Airport West

Ventura Bus Lines operates five routes via Springvale station, under contract to Public Transport Victoria:
 : to Mordialloc station (peak-hour only)
 : Dandenong station – Brighton
 : Dandenong station – Waverley Gardens Shopping Centre
 : Springvale South – Dandenong station
 : to Glen Waverley station

Gallery

References

External links
 Gallery of old station
 Melway map at street-directory.com.au

Premium Melbourne railway stations
Railway stations in Melbourne
Railway stations in Australia opened in 1880
Railway stations in the City of Greater Dandenong